Thompson Station Bank is a property in Thompsons Station, Tennessee, United States, with historical significance during period 1913–1927.  The bank opened in 1913 but only lasted 13 years, and closed in 1927.

The building, built in 1913, was listed on the National Register of Historic Places (NRHP) in 1988.  When listed the property included one contributing building, and one contributing structure.

The building is brick.

See also
Bank of Nolensville, a similar bank of the era, also NRHP-listed

References

1913 establishments in Tennessee
Bank buildings on the National Register of Historic Places in Tennessee
Buildings and structures in Williamson County, Tennessee
Commercial buildings completed in 1913
National Register of Historic Places in Williamson County, Tennessee